The Far Paradise is a 1928 Australian silent film directed by Paulette McDonagh and starring Marie Lorraine the stage name of Isabel McDonagh. This is the second feature from the McDonagh sisters.

Graham Shirley in Australian Cinema commented: "...one of the best-directed of all Australian features prior to the coming of sound."

Plot
In the town of Kirkton, James Carson is involved in crime and is investigated by the Attorney-General, Howard Lawton. Carson's daughter Cherry falls in love with Lawton's son Peter, and Lawton forbids the relationship. James Carson goes into hiding, taking Cherry with him.

A year later Peter finds Cherry selling flowers in a mountain tourist resort, trying to support her now-alcoholic father. Carson dies of a heart attack and Cherry can marry Peter.

Cast
Marie Lorraine as Cherry Carson
Gaston Mervale as James Carson
Arthur McLaglen as Karl Rossi
John Faulkner as Howard Lawton
Paul Longuet as Peter Lawton
Arthur Clarke as Lee Farmer
Harry Halley as Brock

Production
The death of the McDonaghs' father left them £500 in debt after their first film. However a rich uncle of theirs died in Chile, enabling them to start a second movie.

Shooting began in March 1928. The film's interiors were shot at the McDonagh family home, Drummoyne House, Sydney, and the exteriors in the Burragorang Valley and the Bondi studios of Australasian Films, plus some shots done in Melbourne.

Reception
The film was well reviewed and performed strongly at the box office.

References

The Far Paradise at the NSFA
The Argus, Melbourne, Saturday 21 April 1928.

External links

1928 films
1928 drama films
Australian drama films
Australian silent feature films
Australian black-and-white films
Films directed by Paulette McDonagh
1920s English-language films
Silent drama films